Li Jingwen, may refer to:
 Jing Wen, Chinese model.
 Li Jingwen (economist), Chinese economist.